is a Japanese football player who plays for Fujieda MYFC.

Playing career
Morimoto was born in Tottori Prefecture on September 15, 1995. After graduating from Kanto Gakuin University, he joined J2 League club Matsumoto Yamaga FC in 2018. In June, he moved to J3 League club SC Sagamihara.

References

External links

1995 births
Living people
Kanto Gakuin University alumni
Association football people from Tottori Prefecture
Japanese footballers
J2 League players
J3 League players
Japan Football League players
Matsumoto Yamaga FC players
SC Sagamihara players
FC Maruyasu Okazaki players
Fujieda MYFC players
Association football defenders